Adam Itzel Jr. (November 30, 1864 – September 5, 1893) was a 19th-century American conductor and composer.  He was the conductor of the Academy of Music in Baltimore, Maryland. Composer Eliza Woods was one of his students.  Itzel's best-known composition was the light opera The Tar and the Tartar which had its New York premiere on May 11, 1891. 

Adam Itzel died at the age of 29 of consumption in Baltimore, Maryland, September 5, 1893.

References 

1864 births
1893 deaths
19th-century American composers
19th-century conductors (music)
American male composers
American musical theatre composers
19th-century deaths from tuberculosis
Tuberculosis deaths in Maryland